Jackie Gowler (born 7 June 1996) is a New Zealand representative rower.

Biography 
Gowler was born in 1996. She received her secondary schooling at Nga Tawa Diocesan School in Marton. While at school, she took up rowing inspired by her elder sister Kerri and trying to outdo her.

Gowler won a gold medal as a member of the women's eight team at the 2019 World Rowing Championships, alongside her sister Kerri.

References

External links

Living people
1996 births
New Zealand female rowers
World Rowing Championships medalists for New Zealand
Rowers at the 2014 Summer Youth Olympics
People educated at Nga Tawa Diocesan School
Rowers at the 2020 Summer Olympics
Medalists at the 2020 Summer Olympics
Olympic medalists in rowing
Olympic silver medalists for New Zealand
People from Raetihi
21st-century New Zealand women